OTK may refer to:

Organisations
 Austrian Tourist Club (German:  or ÖTK)
 Obrona Terytorium Kraju (ISO 639:otk), territorial defense forces of Poland
 Obchodní tiskárny Kolín, Czech paper and card manufacturers
 One True King, a gaming organization based in Austin, Texas

Other meanings
 Technical Control Department (Russian:  or ОТК)
 Old Turkic (language code)
 One time key, a method related to encryption
 Otakuthon, Montreal's anime convention
 Ottakring, the 16th municipal district of Vienna
 Over-the-knee boots ("OTK boots")
 One Turn Kill (Trading Card Game)